Brian Patrick O'Toole is an American film producer and screenwriter. O'Toole's work includes co-producing the 2002 horror film Dog Soldiers and his screenwriting debut Cemetery Gates. He also wrote a monthly column for the prominent American magazine Fangoria for six years and currently works with Black Gate Entertainment, with whom he has written and produced several films, including Basement Jack, Evilution, Necropolitan and A Necessary Evil. He also wrote the screenplays for the Atlas Shrugged film adaptations.

Life and work
He began his career as a literary agent with the Leslie Kallen Literary Agency and the Helen Garrett Talent Agency before moving on to film producing. Mr. O'Toole's work as script consultant has brought him work with such producers and directors as Sydney Pollack, George A. Romero, Guillermo del Toro, Dan Curtis, Hector Elizondo, Mickey Borofsky, Howard Kazanjian and Neil Marshall, among others. He studied extensively with UCLA's Chairman of Screenwriting Richard Walter and was a member of the Player's Workshop of the Second City in Chicago. Over 20 years of screenwriting and producing career, Mr O'Toole rebooted the werewolf genre with Dog Soldiers, combined horror with comedy in Cemetery Gates, and was one of the first independent filmmakers to use a computer generated character in SleepStalker. In 2007, Mr. O'Toole wrote and produced his first digital films: the zombie actioner Evilution and the thriller Basement Jack. His films have received numerous awards from U.S. and International film festivals. Outside the horror genre, Mr. O'Toole has co-produced the festival favorite Neo Ned and the action thriller Death Valley.

O'Toole also served as the screenwriter for all three installments of the film adaptation of Ayn Rand's Atlas Shrugged.

Filmography
Atlas Shrugged: Part III (2014) – Screenwriter
Atlas Shrugged: Part II (2012) – Screenwriter
Atlas Shrugged: Part I (2011) – Screenwriter
Basement Jack (2008) – Producer/Screenwriter
Evilution (2008) – Producer/Screenwriter
Cemetery Gates (2006) Co-Producer/Screenwriter
Boo (2005) – Co-ProducerNeo Ned (2005) – Co-ProducerDeath Valley (2004) – Co-ProducerDog Soldiers (2002) – Co-ProducerSleepstalker (1995) Co-ProducerMind Twister'' (1994) – Assistant Producer

References

External links

Fatally Yours Interview
Brian Patrick O'Toole Libertas Film Magazine

Year of birth missing (living people)
Living people
American film producers
American male screenwriters
Place of birth missing (living people)